Varadarajanpet is a panchayat town in Ariyalur district in the Indian state of Tamil Nadu.

Demographics
 India census, Varadarajanpettai had a population of 8574. Males constitute 44% of the population and females 56%. Varadarajanpettai has an average literacy rate of 69%, higher than the national average of 59.5%: male literacy is 71%, and female literacy is 66%. In Varadarajanpettai, 12% of the population is under 6 years of age. There are 5 schools and a college: including 2 higher secondary schools, 1 matriculation school and 2 elementary schools. There Don Bosco higher secondary school had completed golden jubilee.

References

Cities and towns in Ariyalur district